Jadara University (Arabic: جامعة جدارا) is a university located in the northern province of Irbid Governorate in Jordan, on the international highway to the north of the city of Irbid, the governorate's capital.

History
Jadara University was approved by the Ministry of Higher Education and Scientific Research in November 2004, and was established in the following year.  It awards undergraduate and master's degrees mainly in Arabic, and English literature, science, and information technology.

The university was named after the historic city of Gadara which is located about 20 km from the university campus.

Academics
There are eight colleges in the university:
 Faculty of Engineering: offers degrees in computer, communications, and civil engineering.
 Faculty of Pharmacy
 Faculty of Education
 Faculty of Law
 Faculty of Business and Administration Sciences
 Faculty of Science and Information Technology
 Faculty of Languages and Humanitarian Sciences
 Faculty of Graduate Studies

References

External links
 Jadara University

 
Educational institutions established in 2005
2005 establishments in Jordan